Anuraag may refer to:

Anuraag (1956 film), see Bollywood films of 1956
Anuraag (1971 film)
Anuraag (1972 film), Hindi